Muhammad Sharif Butt (15 January 1926 – 8 June 2015) was a Pakistani sprinter who competed in the 1948, 1952, and 1956 Summer Olympics.

Competition record

References

1926 births
2015 deaths
Pakistani male sprinters
Olympic athletes of Pakistan
Athletes (track and field) at the 1948 Summer Olympics
Athletes (track and field) at the 1952 Summer Olympics
Athletes (track and field) at the 1956 Summer Olympics
Asian Games gold medalists for Pakistan
Asian Games silver medalists for Pakistan
Asian Games bronze medalists for Pakistan
Asian Games medalists in athletics (track and field)
Athletes (track and field) at the 1954 Asian Games
Athletes (track and field) at the 1958 Asian Games
Athletes (track and field) at the 1954 British Empire and Commonwealth Games
Athletes (track and field) at the 1958 British Empire and Commonwealth Games
Commonwealth Games competitors for Pakistan
Medalists at the 1954 Asian Games
Medalists at the 1958 Asian Games